Dimosthenis Dogkas (Greek: Δημοσθένης Δόγκας, died  October 25, 1905) was a Greek politician from Elis. He was born in Latzoi (Λατζόι) near Karatoula and was descended from a political family.  His father was a mayor of the municipality of Oleni and his sister was the wife of Sotirios Krekoukiotis.

He was elected mayor of Oleni in 1875, Olympia in 1881 and again for Oleni in 1887. He was elected for the Greek parliament as a representative of Elis for the first time in 1881, and was re-elected in 1895 and 1902. He supported the Trikoupis government. He died on October 25, 1905 in Krekouki.

References
''The first version of the article is a translation of the corresponding article at the Greek Wikipedia (el:Main Page))

19th-century births
1905 deaths
Politicians from Elis
People from Elis